Wood trim, alternatively known as wood fascia, is a fascia made of synthetic or varnished, natural wood, usually found on dashboards of luxury cars. Wood trim can be made from natural materials like beechwood, maple, walnut, oak, or from synthetic materials.

In more recent years among the younger population, wood trim has gone out of favor, mostly replaced by carbon fiber reinforced polymers in sports cars or aluminum composites in most luxury offerings, and with the proliferation of cheap offerings from luxury car brands, many will simply omit the option of wood trim to save money on the purchase.

However, it still remains a popular trim among those who like the aesthetic, so many luxury car brands still offer it with the exception of a few (It is said that the company Rolls-Royce is moving away from the use of wood trim by 2020, this however cannot be proven) and third party kits consisting of veneer can also be found for cars or lower trim levels that omit the use of wood trim.

Auto parts